Jeanne Betancourt (born October 2, 1941 in Vermont) is an American author and television script writer best known for her Pony Pals series of books.

Biography
Betancourt was born and raised in rural Vermont. She lived across from a dairy farm; this rural setting would later influence many of her works. During her childhood, she never considered being an author. Instead, she wanted to dance, and studied tap dance. When she grew too tall (at five feet, eight inches) to be a Rockette, she decided to become a religious sister in her junior year of high school. After graduating high school, she moved to Rutland, Vermont where she entered the Sisters of St. Joseph, a teaching order of sisters.

She earned a Bachelor of Science in 1964 from the College of St. Joseph the Provider and a Master of Arts degree in film from New York University in 1974.Women in Focus, her first published work, focuses on her master's degree project.

Betancourt left the Sisters of Saint Joseph and moved to New York City, where she taught public high school. She married and had a daughter, Nicole. She wrote her first children's book, SMILE! How to cope with braces, in 1982 when her daughter Nicole had braces, and soon became a full-time author. She later divorced.

She currently lives either on the top floor of a sixteen-story building near the American Museum of Natural History in New York City or in her home in Connecticut. In her free time she draws, oil paints, gardens, and reads.

Awards
In television, Betancourt has garnered the National Psychological Award for Excellence in the Media, two Humanitas Awards, and six Emmy Award nominations.

Betancourt has also won numerous awards for her novels, including a Children's Choice Award from the International Reading Association and the Children's Book Council for Sweet Sixteen and Never... and a Lifetime Achievement Award.

Select bibliography
Note: all retrieved from (a complete bibliography)

Pony Pals series
My Name is Brain Brian
Puppy Love
Home Sweet Home
The Edge
Dear Diary
Cheer USA series

References

External links
Autobiography

1941 births
Living people
20th-century American novelists
American children's writers
American television writers
American women novelists
Tisch School of the Arts alumni
Pony books
Sisters of Saint Joseph
Novelists from Vermont
American women television writers
American women children's writers
20th-century American women writers
Screenwriters from Vermont
21st-century American novelists
21st-century American women writers
The Baby-Sitters Club